David Delrieu (born 20 February 1971 in Aurillac) is a French former cyclist.

Palmares
1996
1st Overall Tour de l'Ain
1st Stage 5
1st Overall Mi-Août Bretonne
1st Overall Boucles de la Mayenne
1st Stage 11 Tour de l'Avenir
2001
2nd Overall Tour de l'Ain
1st Stage 5

References

1971 births
Living people
French male cyclists
People from Aurillac
Sportspeople from Cantal
Cyclists from Auvergne-Rhône-Alpes